Western Local Escort Force (WLEF) referred to the organization of anti-submarine escorts for World War II trade convoys from North American port cities to the Western Ocean Meeting Point (WOMP or WESTOMP) near Newfoundland where ships of the Mid-Ocean Escort Force (MOEF) assumed responsibility for safely delivering the convoys to the British Isles.

Background
On the basis of experience during World War I, the Admiralty instituted trade convoys in United Kingdom coastal waters from September 1939. Convoys gradually extended westward until HX 129 left Halifax, Nova Scotia on 27 May 1941 as the first convoy to receive escort for the entire trip from Canada. The American Neutrality Zone offered some protection in North American coastal waters until United States declaration of war in December 1941.

Organization
The Royal Canadian Navy organized the Halifax-based Western Local Escort Force in February 1942 as German U-boats began patrolling North American coastal waters during the "second happy time". The Royal Navy provided the WLEF with twelve old, short-range destroyers well-equipped for anti-submarine warfare and manned by experienced personnel. During the winter of 1942–43, some of these destroyers were organized into Western Support Force (WSF) groupings of three ships to augment protection of convoys coming under attack in the western Atlantic.

Operations
The WLEF was theoretically organized into eight escort groups able to provide an escort of four to six ships to each convoy. WLEF escort group assignments were more dynamic than the MOEF escort groups, and WLEF escorts seldom worked with the same team of ships through successive convoys. A WLEF escort group would typically meet a westbound ON convoy at WOMP and then individual WLEF ships would be detached with elements of the convoy proceeding separately to Halifax, Sydney, Nova Scotia, Quebec ports on the St. Lawrence River, Saint John, New Brunswick, Boston, Massachusetts, or New York City. Some WLEF escorts were assigned to coastal convoys reaching as far south as the Caribbean Sea. Eastbound HX convoys and SC convoys worked in reverse forming with a few WLEF escorts in New York City and picking up others as ships joined from New England ports or the Maritimes. Short range escorts or escorts experiencing mechanical problems might be similarly detached and replaced at intermediate points between WOMP and New York City. The most frequent location for escort exchanges was the Halifax Ocean Meeting Point (HOMP) off the WLEF home port of Halifax.

The WLEF operated exclusively within range of anti-submarine patrol bombers; although weather often limited flight operations. U-boats were deployed cautiously in areas where air patrols were expected, so single U-boat encounters were more common than wolf pack engagements.  The name was shortened to "Western Escort Force" (WEF) in the summer of 1943.

Major combat event chronology
 12 May 1942 –  sank two ships in the St. Lawrence River.
 20 July 1942 – U-132 sank one ship from convoy QS 19 escorted by Flower-class corvette , Bangor-class minesweeper  and anti-submarine motor launches Q059, Q064 and Q074.
 29 July 1942 – U-132 sank one ship from convoy ON 113 escorted by WLEF.
 27 August 1942 – Flower-class corvette  sank  while  sank two ships from convoy TAW 15.
 3 September 1942 –  sank one ship from convoy NL 6 escorted by Flower-class corvette HMCS Weyburn and Bangor-class minesweeper .
 11 September 1942 – U-517 sank the Flower-class corvette  that had been traveling with the Bangor-class minesweeper HMCS Clayoquot.
 15–16 September 1942 – U-517 sank two ships and U-165 sank two ships from convoy SQ 36 escorted by Town-class destroyer , Flower-class corvette HMCS Arrowhead, Bangor-class minesweeper HMCS Vegreville, and three motor launches.
 21 September 1942 – Bangor-class minesweeper  defended convoy SQ 38 from U-517.
 7–8 September 1944 – Flower-class corvette  attacked  in the Gulf of St. Lawrence.
 14 October 1944 –  torpedoed   escorting convoy ONS 33G in the Gulf of St. Lawrence.
 23 October 1944 – Three torpedoes from  missed troopship Lady Rodney off Halifax.
 2 November 1944 – U-1223 torpedoed freighter  in the Gulf of St. Lawrence.
 14 January 1945 –  torpedoed Liberty ship  and tankers Athelviking and British Freedom off Halifax Harbour.

Convoy routes
 AH – Aruba to Halifax Harbour a brief tanker series from July to September 1942
 BS – Corner Brook, Newfoundland to Sydney, Nova Scotia
 BW – Sydney, Nova Scotia to St. John's, Newfoundland
 BX – Boston to Halifax Harbour
 CL – St. John's, Newfoundland to Sydney, Nova Scotia
 FH – Saint John, New Brunswick to Halifax Harbour
 HA – Halifax Harbour to Curaçao (1942)
 HF – Halifax Harbour to Saint John, New Brunswick
 HHX – Halifax Harbour to meet HX convoys originating in New York City at the Halifax Ocean Meeting Point (HOMP)
 HJ – Halifax Harbour to St. John's, Newfoundland
 HON – Halifax Harbour to ON convoys at the Halifax Ocean Meeting Point (HOMP)
 HS – Halifax Harbour to Sydney, Nova Scotia
 HT – Halifax Harbour to Trinidad (replaced by HA convoys)
 JH – St. John's, Newfoundland to Halifax Harbour
 JN – St. John's, Newfoundland to Labrador
 LC – Sydney, Nova Scotia to St. John's, Newfoundland
 LN – St. Lawrence River to Labrador
 NJ – Newfoundland coast to St. John's, Newfoundland
 NL – Labrador to St. Lawrence River
 QS – Quebec to Sydney, Nova Scotia
 SB – Sydney, Nova Scotia to Corner Brook, Newfoundland
 SH – Sydney, Nova Scotia to Halifax Harbour
 SHX – Sydney, Nova Scotia to HX convoys
 SQ – Sydney, Nova Scotia to Quebec
 TH – Trinidad to Halifax Harbour
 WS – Wabana, Newfoundland to Sydney, Nova Scotia
 XB – Halifax Harbour to Boston

See also
Battle of the St. Lawrence

Notes

References
 
 
 
 
 
 
 
 
 
 
 

Escort Groups of the Royal Navy in World War II
North American Coastal convoys of World War II
North Atlantic convoys of World War II
American Theater of World War II
Battle of the Atlantic
History of Halifax, Nova Scotia
Royal Canadian Navy
Military units and formations of Canada in World War II
Naval battles and operations of World War II involving the United Kingdom